José Sergio Manzur Quiroga (born 25 January 1955) is a Mexican politician affiliated with the Institutional Revolutionary Party. He currently serves as Deputy of the LXII Legislature of the Mexican Congress representing the State of Mexico.

Biography 
José Manzur Quiroga was born on January 25, 1955, in Aculco, State of Mexico. He's a Certified Public Accountant and a Lawyer. Since 1976 Manzur has been affiliated to the Institutional Revolutionary Party.
A year after José Manzur was affiliated to the Institutional Revolutionary Party, he was named the leader of the Revolutionary Youth Movement; on 1986 he became organizational secretary in the Municipal Committee of the Party; on 1987 he became district chief on Ixtapan de la Sal and on 1988 special chief in Huixquilucan.

On 2012 he went elected as Federal Deputy. During his management many projects were presented to the Mexican Congress, like the Organic Law of Federal Public Administration, with which the public security, Federal police and Federal penitentiary system tasks were transferred to the Ministry of the Interior. On May 22, 2014, he became part of the Cabinet of the Government of the State of Mexico, head of the General Secretariat of State Government.

References

1955 births
Living people
Politicians from the State of Mexico
Institutional Revolutionary Party politicians
21st-century Mexican politicians
Members of the Chamber of Deputies (Mexico) for the State of Mexico